The following is a list of numbered minor planets discovered, co-discovered and re-discovered by the Wide-field Infrared Survey Explorer (WISE), a NASA infrared spaceborne observatory. As of July 2018, the list contains 4093 entries, accredited by the Minor Planet Center as discovered by "WISE". Also see :Category:Discoveries by WISE.

See also 
 
 List of minor planets
 Minor Planet Center

Discoveries